

The Vought O5U was a 1930s prototype American observation floatplane to meet a United States Navy requirement for a catapult launched scouting aircraft. The contract was won by Curtiss who went on to produce the SOC Seagull; only one O5U was built.

Development
The United States Navy contracted three companies to produce prototypes to meet a requirement for a catapult launched biplane, with a central float and folding wings. Douglas produced the XO2D-1, Curtiss the XO3C-1 and Vought the XO5U-1.

The XO5U-1 (serial number 9399) was powered by a single Pratt & Whitney R-1340-12 piston engine and first flew on the 8 May 1934.

The contract was awarded to Curtiss and only one XO5U-1 was built. The Status of Naval Aircraft, dated June 1937, listed the XO5U-1 as assigned at Mustin Field at the Naval Aircraft Factory, Philadelphia, Pennsylvania. It crashed in May 1938.

Specifications (XO5U-1)

See also

References

Notes

Bibliography

 

O05U
1930s United States military reconnaissance aircraft
Single-engined tractor aircraft
Biplanes
Floatplanes
Amphibious aircraft
Aircraft first flown in 1934